Bob Ridgely's snail-eater (Dipsas bobridgelyi), is a non-venomous snake found in Ecuador and Peru.

References

Dipsas
Snakes of South America
Reptiles of Ecuador
Reptiles of Peru
Reptiles described in 2018